Tavia Nyong'o (born 1974) is a critic and scholar of art and performance. He is William Lampson Professor of African American Studies, American Studies and Theater and Performance Studies at Yale University where he teaches courses on black diaspora performance, cultural studies, and critical and aesthetic theory.

Education 

Nyong'o received his B.A. from Wesleyan University. He then received a Marshall Scholarship to study at the University of Birmingham (England). In 2003, he received his PhD in American Studies from Yale, where he studied under the mentorship of Paul Gilroy and Joseph Roach. Nyong'o was the 2004 runner-up for the Ralph Henry Gabriel Dissertation Award given by the American Studies Association annually for the best doctoral dissertation written in the field of American Studies.

Career 
Nyong'o is Professor of African American Studies, American Studies and Theater and Performance Studies at Yale University where he teaches courses on black diaspora performance, cultural studies, social and critical theory. Prior to his appointment at Yale, Nyong'o taught in the Department of Performance Studies at New York University.

His book, The Amalgamation Waltz: Race, Performance, and the Ruses of Memory, is published by the University of Minnesota Press (2009), and won the Errol Hill Award.

In addition, Nyong'o has published articles in The Nation, n+1, the Yale Journal of Criticism, Social Text, Theatre Journal, and GLQ.

Personal life 
He is a cousin of Academy Award winning actress Lupita Nyong'o.

References

External links
"The Amalgamation Waltz: Race, Performance, and the Ruses of Memory"
NYU Performance Studies bio on Nyong'o – accessed on 2007-05-15
Ralph Henry Gabriel Dissertation Award

1974 births
American people of Luo descent
Cultural historians
Living people
Luo people
Wesleyan University alumni
Yale University alumni
Yale University faculty